O'Brien's Castle, also called Furmina Castle, is an early 15th century tower house and National Monument located on Inisheer, Ireland.

Location
O'Brien's Castle is located at one of the island's highest points, in the north of Inisheer.

History
A ringfort once stood on the site, named Dún Formna ("hillfort of the ridge/shoulder", referring to the "shoulder" of land) and dated to between the 5th century BC and 1st century AD.

The castle was built by the Clann Teige, a branch of the powerful O'Brien (Uí Briain) family, in the early 15th century around 1400. It was taken by the Ó Flaithbheartaigh (O'Flahertys) around 1582. It was captured and slighted by Oliver Cromwell's army in 1652, during the Cromwellian conquest of Ireland.

Building

The castle is a rectangular donjon (keep). The original doorway was into the first floor, accessed by an external wooden stairs.

The entire first floor was a great hall, with mural stairs up to the parapet. The ground floor was a basement or storage area with three vaulted chambers. The corbel of a bartizan is visible with a human face carved into it.

References

National Monuments in County Galway
Castles in County Galway
Aran Islands
Hill forts in Ireland